The Harper Lil Breezy is an American ultralight and light-sport aircraft that was designed by Jack Harper and produced by Harper Aircraft of Jacksonville, Florida. While the company was in business the aircraft was supplied as a kit for amateur construction or as a complete ready-to-fly-aircraft.

Design and development

The Lil Breezy was inspired by the similar RLU-1 Breezy and designed to comply with the United States FAR Part 103 Ultralight Vehicles rules in its single place version and also the US light-sport aircraft rules. It features a strut-braced high-wing, a single-seat or optionally a two-seats-in-tandem open cockpit without a windshield, fixed conventional landing gear and a single engine in pusher configuration.

The early Lil Breezy-A is made from welded steel tubing with its flying surfaces covered in doped aircraft fabric. The later "B" model is of aluminium construction, with flying surfaces covered with Dacron sailcloth. Standard engines available included the  Rotax 503 two-stroke powerplant.

Variants
Lil Breezy-A
Initial model, available as a kit, with a steel tube fuselage.
Lil Breezy-B
Second model, available as a kit or later as a complete aircraft only, with aluminium construction.

Specifications (Lil Breezy-B)

See also
Blue Yonder EZ Flyer
Mathews Petit Breezy

References

External links

Harper Aircraft website archives

2000s United States ultralight aircraft
Homebuilt aircraft
Light-sport aircraft
Single-engined pusher aircraft